Klaudia Jans and Alicja Rosolska were the holders of championship title; however, they chose not to play together.
Jans chose to play with Vladimíra Uhlířová and Rosolska participated up with Marta Domachowska. They met in the second round and unseeded pair won in three sets (2–6, 6–4, [11–9]). Rosolska and Domachowska were defeated by Maria Kondratieva and Yaroslava Shvedova in the semifinals.
Sara Errani and Roberta Vinci won in the final 6–4, 6–2, against Kondratieva and Shvedova.

Seeds

Draw

Draw

References
Main Draw

Doubles